Sławomir Lachowski (born 1 January 1958 in Końskie, Poland) is a Polish manager who works in the banking industry in Poland and Central and Eastern Europe.

Education 
Lachowski graduated with distinction from the Foreign Trade faculty of the Central School of Planning and Statistics in Warsaw (now the Warsaw School of Economics). He also studied economics at the University of Johannes Gutenberg in Mainz (1980/1981 and 1988/1989) and the University of Zurich (1983 to 1984). He completed the Advanced Management Programme at INSEAD (1997) and the Stanford Executive Program (SEP) at Stanford University (2002).

Career 

In the years 1983–1990, Lachowski worked as a research assistant at the Institute of Economic Development at the School of Planning and Statistics in Warsaw (now the Warsaw School of Economics). His research group, led by Leszek Balcerowicz (professor of economics, former chairman of the National Bank of Poland and Deputy Prime Minister), worked on plans for Poland’s transition from a centrally planned to a free market economy.

In 1987–1992, Lachowski directed a consulting firm, INTEXIM – Centre for Economic Analysis, which specialized in strategic and financial advice.

In 1993, Lachowski started working in Powszechny Bank Gospodarczy (PBG) in Lodz.

In 1996–1998, Lachowski was the Executive Vice President of the Management Board, and then the First Deputy President of the Management Board at the PBG responsible for retail, corporate and investment banking.

From 1998 to 2000, Lachowski served as the Executive Vice President of the Management Board of Powszechna Kasa Oszczędności BP (PKO BP), the largest Polish bank, where he was initially responsible for retail banking, but over time he became responsible for all business lines, including corporate banking, investment banking, and the real estate market. During that time he oversaw restructuring of the PKO BP and formulating a new development strategy of the bank, owing to which the bank regained its competitiveness. Under the new strategy and the new name PKO Bank Polski, the bank was converted from a savings bank offering simple retail products, into a modern universal bank present in all segments of the market including retail, corporate and institutional customers. In the first year of implementation of the new strategy, the bank attracted nearly one million of new retail customers.[1]

In 2000, Lachowski began working at BRE Bank as a board member in charge of two greenfield, retail banking projects: mBank, the first internet bank in Poland and Central and Eastern Europe, and MultiBank, a modern brick and mortar bank for the emerging middle class and small and medium enterprises (SME). Both banks were successfully launched – mBank within 100 days in November 2000 and MultiBank in 2001.

mBank subsequently successfully entered banking markets in the Czech Republic and Slovakia.[1] Lachowski initiated the project of a European retail bank based on EU passport with international expansion of mBank to the Czech Republic and Slovakia in November 2007.

In 2004, Lachowski become the CEO of BRE Bank. During his tenure, the bank was transformed from a medium-sized corporate bank to a large universal player, becoming the third largest bank in Poland in terms of assets. At the same time, BRE Bank developed a reputation as one of the top financial institutions in the country and was awarded the title “Best Financial Institution” in 2008.[2] Sławomir Lachowski left BRE Bank in March 2008.

In 2013–2015, Lachowski was the CEO of FM Bank PBP, where he completed the merger of FM Bank and PBP Bank, restructuring FM Bank PBP and transforming the bank into a dual brand financial institution, focusing on the prospective target customer groups of the new generation customers and citizens of digital world (Bank SMART) as well as microenterprises and self-employed professionals (BIZ Bank).

In 2016-2021 Lachowski was founder of G-Rock Limited. The firm obtained restricted licences in February 2019. It then preceded to test its systems on a family and friends’ basis with the company’s own funds, with no members of the public involved. The company failed to raise the required capital to roll out its product. This led to its directors relinquishing its limited licences, and as a result placed it into liquidation.

Prizes and awards

2005 

Man of the Polish Internet 2005

2007 

Top Manager of the Year 2007 in Financial Services –awarded in a competition organized by Manager Magazine, KPMG, and Polska Konfederacja Pracodawców Prywatnych Lewiatan

Golden Cross of Merit (state honor) for his achievements in the restructuring the Polish banking sector

Social activities and philanthropy 

In 2008, Lachowski and his wife, Marzena Lachowska, founded Ex-Litteris Libertas, a charity devoted to creating equal opportunities for children from rural areas by supporting various educational and leisure activities.

Publications

Books 

“Acting on Values. Leadership in Turbulent Times” Kindle Edition, Studio Emka, 2015

“Od wartości do działania. Przywództwo w czasach przełomowych”, Studio Emka, Warszawa 2013

„DROGA ważniejsza niż cel. Wartości w życiu i biznesie”, Studio Emka, Warszawa, 2012

“It’s the Journey not the Destination. Values in Life and Business. Guide to Management by Values”, Kindle Edition, Studio Emka, 2012

“Disruptive Innovation in Banking: A Business Case in Low-Cost Finance. How to Win Against the Leaders by Creating Strategic Competitive Advantage and Real Value for Customers” Kindle Edition, Studio Emka, 2012

„Droga innowacji. Pracuj ciężko, baw się, zmieniaj świat”, Studio Emka, Warszawa, 2010

Articles 
„Kryzys długiego dystansu.” ThinkTank Magazine, 2/2009
„Firma w firmie - kiedy tradycyjna firma musi szybko działać by wygrać.”, Harvard Business Review Polska, nr 7, 2003
„Praca w e-biznesie.” Sławomir Lachowski, Nina Georgiew. Zarządzanie Zasobami ludzkimi, nr 2, IPiSS, Warszawa, 2002
„Praca w e-biznesie.” Sławomir Lachowski, Nina Georgiew. Zarządzanie Zasobami ludzkimi, nr 2, IPiSS, Warszawa, 2002
„Prywatyzacja sektora bankowego jako czynnik wspomagający długofalowy wzrost gospodarczy (II)”, Bank i Kredyt, nr 9, 1998
„Prywatyzacja sektora bankowego jako czynnik wspomagający długofalowy wzrost gospodarczy (I)”, Bank i Kredyt, nr 7-8, 1998
„Procesy konsolidacji sektora bankowego. Niezwykłe przyspieszenie.” Bank. nr 1, 1998
„Kierunki rozwoju polskiego systemu bankowego.” Bank. nr 12, 1997
„Proces prywatyzacji banków w Polsce – sukcesy i porażki.” Bank i Kredyt, nr 11, 1997
“System finansowy w Polsce – stan obecny i perspektywy rozwoju.”, CASE, Raporty CASE, nr 8, 1997
„The Process of Privatising Banks in Poland: Successes and Failures of a Multitrac Path.”, OECD Advisory Group on Privatisation, Eleventh Plenary Session: Banks and Privatisation, Rome, 1997
„Wpływ regulacji podatkowych na wybór ścieżki restrukturyzacji złego długu.” Bank i Kredyt, nr 1-2, 1996
„Restrukturyzacja portfela kredytów trudnych banku komercyjnego w okresie transformacji. Studium przypadku: Powszechny Bank Gospodarczy SA w Łodzi.”, Bank i Kredyt, nr 5,1995
“Restructuring of a Bad Debt Portfolio in a Commercial Bank in the Midst of an Economic Transition Period. Case Study: Powszechny Bank Gospadarczy w Łodzi.”, CASE Studies&Analyses, nr 57, 1995

References

External links
 Sławomir Lachowski's Official Website (Polish)
 Ex Litteris Libertas's Website (Polish)

Polish bankers
Polish economists
Living people
1958 births